Alexandra Bjärrenholt (born 19 February 1992) is a Swedish handballer for Skuru IK and the Swedish national team.

She made her debut on the Swedish national team on 15 June 2018.

Achievements 
SHE:
Gold Medalist: 2021
Silver Medalist: 2013, 2014, 2015, 2016, 2019
Swedish Handball Cup:
Gold Medalist: 2022

References

1992 births
Living people
People from Norrtälje
Swedish female handball players
Sportspeople from Stockholm County
21st-century Swedish women